Mohammad Ahmed Suleiman (born 23 November 1969) is a Qatari middle-distance runner of Somali descent that won Qatar its first Olympic medal ever.

Career
Suleiman was born in Buuhoodle, Somalia to a noble lineage of the Dhulbahante, Farah Garad (Baharsame) and was naturalized in Qatar in his youth.

At the age of 18, Suleiman participated in the Olympic Games in Seoul over 1500 metres. However, he did not progress to the semi-finals. In 1991, Suleiman qualified for the World Championships in Tokyo, where he came in ninth.

In 1992, he achieved the greatest success of his career when he won the bronze medal in the Barcelona Olympics thus becoming the first-ever Olympic medallist for Qatar. Throughout his career, Suleiman ran several Asian records over 1500 m and the mile run.

He won the gold medal in the 1500 m representing Asia at the 1992 IAAF World Cup. Suleiman ran for Qatar at two further Olympic Games (in 1996 and 2000) and reached the event finals, although he did not make the podium.

Suleiman's younger brothers Nasser and Abdulrahman Suleiman have also competed internationally in middle-distance running – Abdulrahman was the 2002 Asian champion in the 1500 m.

Notes

References

External links

1969 births
Living people
Qatari male middle-distance runners
Athletes (track and field) at the 1988 Summer Olympics
Athletes (track and field) at the 1992 Summer Olympics
Athletes (track and field) at the 1996 Summer Olympics
Athletes (track and field) at the 2000 Summer Olympics
Olympic athletes of Qatar
Olympic bronze medalists for Qatar
Asian Games medalists in athletics (track and field)
Athletes (track and field) at the 1986 Asian Games
Qatari people of Somali descent
Athletes (track and field) at the 1990 Asian Games
Athletes (track and field) at the 1994 Asian Games
Athletes (track and field) at the 1998 Asian Games
Medalists at the 1992 Summer Olympics
Olympic bronze medalists in athletics (track and field)
Asian Games gold medalists for Qatar
Asian Games bronze medalists for Qatar
Medalists at the 1986 Asian Games
Medalists at the 1990 Asian Games
Medalists at the 1994 Asian Games
Medalists at the 1998 Asian Games